Peter, Paul and Nanette (German: Peter, Paul und Nanette) is a 1935 German comedy film directed by Erich Engels and starring Hermann Thimig, Hans Junkermann and Hilde Krüger.

Cast
 Hermann Thimig as Peter Pellmann / Paul Polter  
 Hans Junkermann as Arthur Bergmann  
 Hilde Krüger as Nanette, seine Tochter 
 Olga Limburg as Ida, seine Schwester  
 Paul Heidemann as Martin Götz  
 Hilde Hildebrand as Mary  
 Paul Henckels as Professor Leblanc  
 Jakob Tiedtke as Sebastian 
 Wolfgang von Schwindt as Max  
 Hans Richter as Fritz  
 Paula Denk as Adele  
 Jupp Hussels as Verleger

References

Bibliography 
 Waldman, Harry. Nazi Films In America, 1933-1942. McFarland & Co, 2008.

External links 
 

1935 films
1935 comedy films
German comedy films
Films of Nazi Germany
1930s German-language films
Films directed by Erich Engels
German black-and-white films
Tobis Film films
1930s German films